Dissociative disorders (DD) are conditions that involve disruptions or breakdowns of memory, awareness, identity, or perception. People with dissociative disorders use dissociation as a defense mechanism, pathologically and involuntarily. The individual experiences these dissociations to protect themselves. Some dissociative disorders are triggered by psychological trauma, but depersonalization-derealization disorder may be preceded only by stress, psychoactive substances, or no identifiable trigger at all.

The dissociative disorders listed in the American Psychiatric Association's DSM-5 are as follows:

 Dissociative identity disorder (formerly multiple personality disorder): the alternation of two or more distinct personality states with impaired recall among personality states. In extreme cases, the host personality is unaware of the other, alternating personalities; however, the alternate personalities can be aware of all the existing personalities. 
 Dissociative amnesia (formerly psychogenic amnesia): the temporary loss of recall memory, specifically episodic memory, due to a traumatic or stressful event. It is considered the most common dissociative disorder amongst those documented. This disorder can occur abruptly or gradually and may last minutes to years depending on the severity of the trauma and the patient. Dissociative fugue was previously a separate category but is now treated as a specifier for dissociative amnesia.
 Depersonalization-derealization disorder: periods of detachment from self or surrounding which may be experienced as "unreal" (lacking in control of or "outside" self) while retaining awareness that this is only a feeling and not a reality.
 The old category of dissociative disorder not otherwise specified is now split into two: other specified dissociative disorder, and unspecified dissociative disorder. These categories are used for forms of pathological dissociation that do not fully meet the criteria of the other specified dissociative disorders; or if the correct category has not been determined; or the disorder is transient.

The ICD-11 lists dissociative disorders as:
 Dissociative neurological symptom disorder 
 Dissociative amnesia 
 Dissociative amnesia with dissociative fugue
 Trance disorder 
 Possession trance disorder 
 Dissociative identity disorder 
 Partial dissociative identity disorder
 Depersonalization-derealization disorder

Cause and treatment

Dissociative identity disorder

Cause: Dissociative identity disorder is caused by ongoing childhood trauma that occurs before the ages of six to nine. People with dissociative identity disorder usually have close relatives who have also had similar experiences.

Treatment: Long-term psychotherapy to improve the patient's quality of life.

Dissociative amnesia

Cause: A way to cope with trauma.

Treatment: Psychotherapy (e.g. talk therapy) counseling or psychosocial therapy which involves talking about your disorder and related issues with a mental health provider. Psychotherapy often involves hypnosis (help you remember and work through the trauma); creative art therapy (using creative process to help a person who cannot express his or her thoughts); cognitive therapy (talk therapy to identify unhealthy and negative beliefs/behaviors); and medications (antidepressants, anti-anxiety medications, or sedatives). These medications help control the symptoms associated with the dissociative disorders, but there are no medications yet that specifically treat dissociative disorders. However, the medication pentothal can sometimes help to restore the memories. The length of an event of dissociative amnesia may be a few minutes or several years. If an episode is associated with a traumatic event, the amnesia may clear up when the person is removed from the traumatic situation. Dissociative fugue was a separate category but is now listed as a specifier for dissociative amnesia.

Depersonalization-derealization disorder

Cause: Dissociative disorders usually develop as a way to cope with trauma. The disorders most often form in children subjected to chronic physical, sexual or emotional abuse or, less frequently, a home environment that is otherwise frightening or highly unpredictable; however, this disorder can also acutely form due to severe traumas such as war or the death of a loved one.

Treatment: Same treatment as dissociative amnesia. An episode of depersonalization-derealization disorder can be as brief as a few seconds or continue for several years.

Dissociative disorders, especially dissociative identity disorder (DID), while being the result of extraordinary abuse and trauma in childhood, it should not be attributed exotic status. DID would be better examined through a more holistic lens, taking into considering the social, cognitive, and neural components, and how they interact with one another.

Medications 
There are no medications to treat dissociative disorders, however, drugs to treat anxiety and depression that may accompany the disorders can be given.

Diagnosis and prevalence
The lifetime prevalence of dissociative disorders varies from 10% in the general population to 46% in psychiatric inpatients. Diagnosis can be made with the help of structured clinical interviews such as the Dissociative Disorders Interview Schedule (DDIS) and the Structured Clinical Interview for DSM-IV Dissociative Disorders (SCID-D-R), and behavioral observation of dissociative signs during the interview. Additional information can be helpful in diagnosis, including the Dissociative Experiences Scale or other questionnaires, performance-based measures, records from doctors or academic records, and information from partners, parents, or friends. A dissociative disorder cannot be ruled out in a single session and it is common for patients diagnosed with a dissociative disorder to not have a previous dissociative disorder diagnosis due to a lack of clinician training. Some diagnostic tests have also been adapted or developed for use with children and adolescents such as the Adolescent Dissociative Experiences Scale, Children's Version of the Response Evaluation Measure (REM-Y-71), Child Interview for Subjective Dissociative Experiences, Child Dissociative Checklist (CDC), Child Behavior Checklist (CBCL) Dissociation Subscale, and the Trauma Symptom Checklist for Children Dissociation Subscale.

Dissociative disorders have been found to be quite prevalent in outpatient populations, as well as within low-income communities. One study found that in a population of poor inner-city outpatients, there was a 29% prevalence of dissociative disorders.

There are problems with classification, diagnosis and therapeutic strategies of dissociative and conversion disorders which can be understood by the historic context of hysteria. Even current systems used to diagnose DD such as the DSM-IV and ICD-10 differ in the way the classification is determined. In most cases mental health professionals are still hesitant to diagnose patients with Dissociative Disorder, because before they are considered to be diagnosed with Dissociative Disorder these patients have more than likely been diagnosed with major depressive disorder, anxiety disorder, and most often post-traumatic stress disorder. It has been found from interviews with those who may be afflicted with dissociative disorders may be more effective at getting an accurate diagnosis than self-scoring assessments and scales.

The prevalence of dissociative disorders is not completely understood due to the many difficulties in diagnosing dissociative disorders. Many of these difficulties stem from a misunderstanding of dissociative disorders, from an unfamiliarity diagnosis or symptoms to disbelief in some dissociative disorders entirely. Due to this it has been found that only 28% to 48% of people diagnosed with a dissociative disorder receive treatment for their mental health. Patients who are misdiagnosed are often those more likely to be hospitalised repeatedly, and lack of treatment can result in intensive outpatient treatment and higher rates of disability.

An important concern in the diagnosis of dissociative disorders in forensic interviews is the possibility that the patient may be feigning symptoms in order to escape negative consequences. Young criminal offenders report much higher levels of dissociative disorders, such as amnesia. In one study it was found that 1% of young offenders reported complete amnesia for a violent crime, while 19% claimed partial amnesia. There have also been cases in which people with dissociative identity disorder provide conflicting testimonies in court, depending on the personality that is present.
The world-wide prevalence of dissociative disorders is not well understood due to different cultural beliefs surrounding human emotions and the human brain.

Children and adolescents

Dissociative disorders (DD) are widely believed to have roots in adverse childhood experiences including abuse and loss, but the symptoms often go unrecognized or are misdiagnosed in children and adolescents. However, a recent western Chinese study showed an increase in awareness of dissociative disorders present in children These studies show that DD's have an intricate relationship with the patient's mental, physical and socio-cultural environments. This study suggested that dissociative disorders are more common in Western, or developing countries, however, some cases have been seen in both clinical and non-clinical Chinese populations. There are several reasons why recognizing symptoms of dissociation in children is challenging: it may be difficult for children to describe their internal experiences; caregivers may miss signals or attempt to conceal their own abusive or neglectful behaviors; symptoms can be subtle or fleeting; disturbances of memory, mood, or concentration associated with dissociation may be misinterpreted as symptoms of other disorders.

Another resource, Beacon House, informs us of dissociative disorder in children, suggesting that it is a survival mechanism that often goes unnoticed in children that have been traumatised. Dr. Shoshanah Lyons suggests that traumatised children often continue to dissociate even though they might not be in any danger, and that they are often unaware that they are dissociating. In addition to developing diagnostic tests for children and adolescents (see above), a number of approaches have been developed to improve recognition and understanding of dissociation in children. Recent research has focused on clarifying the neurological basis of symptoms associated with dissociation by studying neurochemical, functional and structural brain abnormalities that can result from childhood trauma. Others in the field have argued that recognizing disorganized attachment (DA) in children can help alert clinicians to the possibility of dissociative disorders. In their 2008 article, Rebecca Seligman and Laurence Kirmayer suggest the existence of evidence of linkages between trauma experienced in childhood and the capacity for dissociation or depersonalisation. They also suggest that individuals who are able to utilise dissociative techniques are able to keep this as an extended strategy to cope with stressful situations. 

Clinicians and researchers stress the importance of using a developmental model to understand both symptoms and the future course of DDs. In other words, symptoms of dissociation may manifest differently at different stages of child and adolescent development and individuals may be more or less susceptible to developing dissociative symptoms at different ages. Further research into the manifestation of dissociative symptoms and vulnerability throughout development is needed. Related to this developmental approach, more research is required to establish whether a young patient's recovery will remain stable over time.

Current debates and the DSM-5
A number of controversies surround DD in adults as well as children. First, there is ongoing debate surrounding the etiology of dissociative identity disorder (DID). The crux of this debate is if DID is the result of childhood trauma and disorganized attachment. A proposed view is that dissociation has a physiological basis, in that it involves automatically triggered mechanisms such as increased blood pressure and alertness, that would, as Lynn contends, imply its existence as a cross-species disorder. A second area of controversy surrounds the question of whether or not dissociation as a defense versus pathological dissociation are qualitatively or quantitatively different. Experiences and symptoms of dissociation can range from the more mundane to those associated with posttraumatic stress disorder (PTSD) or acute stress disorder (ASD) to dissociative disorders. Mirroring this complexity, the DSM-5 workgroup considered grouping dissociative disorders with other trauma/stress disorders, but instead decided to put them in the following chapter to emphasize the close relationship. The DSM-5 also introduced a dissociative subtype of PTSD.

A 2012 review article supports the hypothesis that current or recent trauma may affect an individual's assessment of the more distant past, changing the experience of the past and resulting in dissociative states. However, experimental research in cognitive science continues to challenge claims concerning the validity of the dissociation construct, which is still based on Janetian notions of structural dissociation. Even the claimed etiological link between trauma/abuse and dissociation has been questioned. Links observed between trauma/abuse and DD are largely only present from a Western cultural context. For non-Western cultures dissociation "may constitute a "normal" psychological capacity". An alternative model proposes a perspective on dissociation based on a recently established link between a labile sleep–wake cycle and memory errors, cognitive failures, problems in attentional control, and difficulties in distinguishing fantasy from reality."

Debates around DD also stem from Western versus non-Western lenses of viewing the disorder, and associated views of causes of DD. DID was initially believed to be specific to the West, until cross-cultural studies indicated its occurrence worldwide. Conversely, anthropologists have largely done little work on DD in the West relating to its perceptions of possession syndromes that would be present in non-Western societies. While dissociation has been viewed and catalogued by anthropologists differently in the West and non-Western societies, there are aspects of each that show DD has universal characteristics. For example, while shamanic and rituals of non-Western societies may hold dissociative aspects, this is not exclusive as many Christian sects, such as "possession by the Holy Ghost" share similar qualities to those of non-Western trances.

See also
 Complex post-traumatic stress disorder

References

External links 
 Dissociative disorders—Mayo Clinic
 Depersonalization Disorder—Cleveland Clinic
 International Society for the Study of Trauma and Dissociation

Dissociative disorders